Cliney Allen (1910 - death date unknown) was an American baseball pitcher in the Negro leagues. He played with the Hilldale Club and the Bacharach Giants in 1932.

References

External links
 and Baseball-Reference Black Baseball Stats and  Seamheads 

Bacharach Giants players
Hilldale Club players
1910 births
Year of death missing
Baseball pitchers
Baseball players from North Carolina